Dus may refer to:
 Dus, a 2005 Indian film
 Dus (1997 film), an incomplete film by Mukul Anand
 Dus (surname)
 Đus, Serbian rapper

DUS  may refer to:
 Düsseldorf Airport (IATA code: DUS)
 Detroit University School, now University Liggett School
 Durham Union Society
 Denver Union Station
 Disinct, Uniform and Stable - the requirements for new varieties of plants to be eligible for Plant breeders' rights

DUs refers to members of the Delta Upsilon fraternity.

See also 
 Duss (disambiguation)